Brackenthwaite is a settlement situated some  south-east of the town of Wigton in the English county of Cumbria.

For administrative purposes, Brackenthwaite lies within the civil parish of Westward, the district of Allerdale, and the county of Cumbria. It is within the Penrith and The Border constituency of the United Kingdom Parliament. Prior to Brexit in 2020 it was part of the North West England constituency of the European Parliament.

Etymology 
Bracanethuaite 12th Century. Old Norse brakni 'bush' and thveit 'assart' like Bregentved (Denmark) and Bracquetuit (Normandy).

References 

Villages in Cumbria
Allerdale